Beilinggongyuan is a station on Line 2 of the Shenyang Metro. The station opened on 30 December 2011. This station locates at the south gate of the Qing Zhao Mausoleum and Beiling Park, also known as Zhaoling or Beiling.

Station Layout

References 

Railway stations in China opened in 2011
Shenyang Metro stations